Matiu Parakatone Tahu (?–1863/64?) was a notable New Zealand tribal tohunga and mission teacher. Of Māori descent, he identified with the Ngai Te Rangi iwi.

References

1863 deaths
New Zealand Māori schoolteachers
Tohunga
Ngāi Te Rangi people
New Zealand Māori religious leaders
Year of birth unknown